David Brinton (born January 17, 1967) is an American former cyclist. He competed in the individual pursuit event at the 1988 Summer Olympics.

Career
During Brinton's cycling career he competed in seven World Championships, won gold and silver medals at the Pan American Games, set four national records and competed in the 1988 Olympic Games in Seoul. After his cycling career Brinton worked as a Hollywood Stuntman for 17 years, appearing in more than 120 films. He has recently began competing internationally earning four Master World Track Championship titles and setting three Master World Records in 2013–2015, also working as a cycling coach and motivational speaker.

References

External links
 

1967 births
Living people
American male cyclists
Olympic cyclists of the United States
Cyclists at the 1988 Summer Olympics
People from Covina, California
Cyclists from California
Pan American Games medalists in cycling
Pan American Games gold medalists for the United States
Pan American Games silver medalists for the United States
Cyclists at the 1987 Pan American Games
Medalists at the 1987 Pan American Games
20th-century American people
21st-century American people